Dr. Abdul Rahman Kamudi (born c. 1955) is a Libyan politician served as Secretary of the General People's Committee of Libya as General Authority for Investment. Born in Benghazi, Libya, Kamudi was educated in universities in the United States. He holds a doctorate in management sciences from the University of Oregon and an MBA from the University of Washington.

Notes

External links
GPCO Website
Libya: Country Profile 
General People's Committee For Youth and Sports - Libya Homepage

Members of the General People's Committee of Libya
Living people
People from Benghazi
1955 births